Susan Hauptman (1947–2015) was an American artist who worked exclusively on paper with charcoal, pastel and, later, other elements, such as gold leaf, wire mesh and thread. She is best known for her stark, enigmatic, often expressionless self-portraits in which she depicted herself with precise and candid detail in ways critics described as strikingly androgynous and that confronted cultural notions of beauty, reality, femininity and masculinity. She has had one-person shows in several museums including the Norton Gallery of Art, West Palm Beach, FL,  the Oakland Museum, Oakland, CA and the Corcoran Gallery of Art,  Washington, D.C.

Her later still lifes were of porcelain figures and fruit-box-type labels, fanciful and often romantic. They are thought to be narrative.

Susan Hauptman's self is drawn both life-scale and larger-than-life. She draws close to a traditional definition of drawing, where the drawing fundamentals of value, tone, shading, composition and, to a lesser extent, line, are formal elements within each work, modulations of elemental light and shadow. These fundamentals are transformed by her— the artist as alchemist.  Her work transcends its materiality in and as drawing, offering us both the noun and verb of drawing, until we are presented with seemingly autonomous, illusionistic imaginative drawings, moments in an overarching narrative.

Her work is in the collections of numerous of major galleries and museums, including the Metropolitan Museum of Art in New York City, the Smithsonian American Art Museum, Washington, DC, the Smithsonian National Portrait Gallery, Washington D.C., Crystal Bridges Museum of American Art, Bentonville, AR, the Norton Museum of Art, West Palm Beach, Fl., Arkansas Art Center, Little Rock, AR,  Achenbach Foundation for Graphic Arts, San Francisco, CA, California Palace of the Legion of Honor, San Francisco, CA; Oakland Museum, Oakland, CA, and the Yale University Art Gallery, Richard Brown Baker Collection, New Haven, CT.

She held numerous teaching positions, including the Lamar Dodd Professorial Chair at the University of Georgia from 1997 to 2000.

She was married to Leonard Post, whom she often drew.

Gallery

References

1947 births
2015 deaths
University of Michigan alumni
20th-century American artists
20th-century American women artists
21st-century American artists
21st-century American women artists
Artists from Michigan
Wayne State University alumni
University of Georgia faculty
National Endowment for the Arts Fellows
American women academics